Songfacts is a music-oriented website that has articles about songs, detailing the meaning behind the lyrics, how and when they were recorded, and any other info that can be found.  

The journalists who work for the site have interviewed thousands of artists and songwriters to get the facts behind the songs, including Peter Murphy, Gene Simmons, Mick Jones, Ian Anderson, Brad Arnold (3 Doors Down), Billy Steinberg, Matt Thiessen, Tomas Haake, Jo Dee Messina,  Marc Roberge, Bill Withers, Janis Ian and Emily Saliers.

The site was started by WHCN DJ Carl Wiser in Hartford, Connecticut, in August 1999. Wiser originally created the list as a database to prepare for his radio programs but then he posted it online. It was initially used mainly by DJs, but in 2002 it was chosen as a "Yahoo! Pick". 

The August 2004 issue of Men's Journal listed Songfacts as one of the "100 Best Websites for Guys". USA Weekend has praised it as "a virtual Behind the Music".

References

External links

Internet properties established in 1999
Online databases
American music websites
Online music and lyrics databases
Companies based in Hartford, Connecticut
1999 establishments in Connecticut